Susan Wrigglesworth (16 September 1954 – 17 March 1996), whose married name was Susan Wojciechowski, was the youngest female foilist in the history of British fencing to compete in the Olympic Games. She attended Croydon High School and, at the age of 17, competed in the 1972 Summer Olympics in Munich. She reached the World Youth final and came 13th in the individual event in the 1976 Summer Olympics in Montreal. Four years later she competed in the 1980 Summer Olympics in Moscow. She was married to Polish Olympic fencer Ziemowit Wojciechowski.

References

External links
 
 Sue Wojciechowska – A Fencing Legacy: YouTube 24 November 2020

1954 births
1996 deaths
British female fencers
Olympic fencers of Great Britain
Fencers at the 1972 Summer Olympics
Fencers at the 1976 Summer Olympics
Fencers at the 1980 Summer Olympics
People from Westminster
Sportspeople from London
People educated at Croydon High School